Robin Wood (24 January 1944 – 17 October 2021) was a Paraguayan comic book writer and author. He is mostly known for his classical work in Argentine comics and his later work in European comics.

Biography
Born to a family of Australian-Paraguayan origins in 1944, Wood spent his childhood between Paraguay and Argentina with his mother, before leaving to do various jobs, such as dishwasher, truck driver, salesman, wood chopper, journalist and factory worker in those two countries as well as in Brazil. Anne Whitehead's 1997 book on New Australia, Paradise Mislaid, provides a chapter on Robin Wood's childhood with his extended Australian-Paraguayan family.

Wood settled in Buenos Aires while working as a correspondent for Argentine newspaper El Territorio, and worked a series of unqualified jobs before he started writing scripts for popular comic book publishing company Columba. His first published work was Aquí la retirada, illustrated by his friend Lucho Olivera, in the magazine D'artagnan, and would soon become one of the most important comic writers not only of Argentine comics, but that of Latin America.

Wood settled in Denmark with his Danish wife Anne-Mette and their children.

Wood died on 17 October 2021 at the age of 77 in Asunción, Paraguay.

Works
Among Wood's most important works are Nippur de Lagash (1967, art by Olivera), Dennis Martin (1967), Dago (1980, Alberto Salinas), Savarese (1978, Mandrafina), Mark, Big Norman, Martin Hel, Merlin, Wolf, Gilgamesh el inmortal (Olivera), Morgan, Dax, Los Amigos, El Cosaco, Aquí la Legión, Mojado and Helena, and the humour comics of Pepe Sánchez and Mi novia y yo, both illustrated by Carlos Vogt.

References

External links
Robin Wood on Lambiek's Comiclopedia
 Official Site
  Biography
  Biography
 Interview with Robin Wood Blancas Murallas by Ariel Avilez and Germán Lanzillotta

Paraguayan people of Australian descent
Paraguayan comics writers
Argentine comics writers
1944 births
2021 deaths
Paraguayan emigrants to Denmark
Paraguayan expatriates in Argentina